The Battle of Oujda occurred when the Almohad Caliph, supported by the Marinids, directed an offensive against the Zayyanids.

In 1248 the Almohads, joined by the Marinids who had just submitted to the Almohad Caliph, laid siege to the fortress where Yaghmurasen ibn Zyan was staying. The Almohad Caliph Abu al-Hasan as-Said al-Mutadid had set up camp and invited Yaghmurasen to submit to him and recognise him as his overlord. Yaghmurasen rejected this invitation and the Almohad Caliph marched against him, the Almohad Caliph was ambushed and defeated by Yaghmurasen. The Almohad Caliph was killed, his head was taken and ordered to be shown to his mother.

References

Battles involving the Almohad Caliphate
Medieval Algeria
1248